BET1-like protein is a protein that in humans is encoded by the BET1L gene.

Interactions 

BET1L has been shown to interact with:
 GOSR1, 
 STX5, and
 YKT6.

References

External links

Further reading